

List of colonial heads of Mauritania

(Dates in italics indicate de facto continuation of office)

For continuation after independence, see: Heads of state of Mauritania

See also
Mauritania
Heads of state of Mauritania
Heads of government of Mauritania
Lists of office-holders

History of Mauritania
Government of Mauritania
French colonial governors of Mauritania